Novonikolsk is a rural locality (a selo) in Pervomayskoye Rural Settlement, Bogucharsky District, Voronezh Oblast, Russia. The population was 103 as of 2010. There are 4 streets.

Geography 
Novonikolsk is located 49 km south of Boguchar (the district's administrative centre) by road. Lebedinka is the nearest rural locality.

References 

Rural localities in Bogucharsky District